William P. Linehan is a former member and President of the Boston City Council in Boston, Massachusetts. He represented District 2, which includes Downtown Boston, the South End, South Boston and Chinatown.

Early life  
Linehan was born in Boston and is the oldest of eight children. He has been active in politics since his teenage years. He graduated magna cum laude from the University of Massachusetts Boston.

Career
Before his election to the City Council, Linehan served as the Director of Operations for the City of Boston's Parks Department and later as the Special Assistant to the Chief Operating Officer of the City of Boston for six years.

Linehan was first elected to the City Council via a special election in May 2007, following the death of Councillor James M. Kelly. Linehan was re-elected five times, until announcing in February 2017 that he would not run in the November 2017 election. Linehan was president of the City Council in 2014 and 2015.

In 2014, Linehan championed a proposal to rename South Boston's Branch Library for former Massachusetts Senate President William M. Bulger.

Personal life 
Linehan and his wife, Judy, have four children and six grandchildren.

References

Further reading
 
 
 "Linehan's name game". The Boston Globe. November 22, 2014.
 Irons, Meghan E. and Ryan, Andrew. "Council head now says raise can wait: Before expected vote, Linehan cites ethics panel advice". The Boston Globe. October 7, 2014.
 Ryan, Andrew. "Linehan proposes 29% raise for City Council". The Boston Globe. September 16, 2014.
 "Linehan stirs up resentments with proposal to honor Bulger". The Boston Globe. August 15, 2014.
 Baker, Billy. "Linehan to skip St. Patrick's parade: City Council leader invited to Ireland". The Boston Globe. February 13, 2014.
 Irons, Meghan E. "Linehan elected council president". The Boston Globe. January 7, 2014.
 Irons, Meghan E. "Linehan poised to take council reins: Appears to have secured backers". The Boston Globe. December 10, 2013.
 Irons, Meghan E. "Linehan, Lee: The rematch: Incumbent city councilor talks up his accomplishments as a 'persistent' rival aims to finish what she began 2 years ago". The Boston Globe. October 24, 2013.
 Irons, Meghan E. "Councilor Bill Linehan pulls out of District 2 debate". The Boston Globe. October 24, 2013.
 
 Ryan, Andrew. "Song in back pocket, Linehan steps up: Councilor warily prepares for a St. Patrick's Day tradition in Boston". The Boston Globe. March 16, 2013.
 Cassidy, Chris. "Linehan sings praises for St. Pat's Day fest". McClatchy - Tribune Business News . February 17, 2013.
 Irons, Meghan E. "Linehan stands by his council redistricting plan". The Boston Globe. November 29, 2011.
 MacQuarrie, Brian. "Linehan keeps District 2 seat in recount: But councilor's redistricting plan draws fire". The Boston Globe. November 24, 2011.
 Wedge, Dave. "Bill Linehan, recount behind him, vows more focus on schools". McClatchy - Tribune Business News . November 24, 2011.
 Ryan, Andrew. "Linehan is facing his first challenge". The Boston Globe. September 26, 2011.
 Van Sack, Jessica. "Southie reigns supreme ; Linehan captures Kelly seat". Boston Herald. May 16, 2007.
 Matt Viser. Shoe leather makes it a race. Boston Globe, May 12, 2007
 Slack, Donovan. "Passoni, Linehan reshift focus - Begin groundwork for council seat". The Boston Globe. April 19, 2007.
 Slack, Donovan. "Passoni, Linehan top race for council". The Boston Globe. April 18, 2007.
 Johnson, O'Ryan. "Passoni, Linehan to battle for council seat". Boston Herald. April 18, 2007.

External links
 City of Boston, official Boston City Councillors website
 Universal Hub. Various articles about Linehan

Boston City Council members
People from South End, Boston
People from South Boston
Year of birth missing (living people)
Living people
Massachusetts Democrats